Where I Belong is the debut full-length album by Australian Christian rock band Revive. It was released in October 2004 on Koorong, an independent record label, and produced by Phil Gaudion in Crystal Studios and Sony Studios.

Background
Revive members Tyler Hall on guitar and Dave Hanbury on vocals had played together as Me + Ty, in Sydney, New South Wales, at local churches and schools through 2003; they released a single, "Going Up?". They were joined by Mike TenKate on drums and Rich Thompson on bass guitar, and became Revive in 2004. Hanbury recalled their first interstate trip to perform at a Queensland festival ended en route with a disabled van.

By October 2004, they had released, Where I Belong on Koorong, an independent record label, as their debut album, which was produced by Phil Gaudion (from Paul Colman Trio) in Crystal Studios and Sony Studios.

Track listing
"Find It Here" – 4:17
"Wash Away" – 3:51
"Power" – 3:38
"Where I Belong" – 4:25
"Carefree" – 4:09
"Forever" – 3:56
"In Awe" – 4:38
"Lift Me Up" – 3:32
"Coming Back" – 2:04
"Always" – 4:29
"You Know" – 12:52
Features hidden track "I'm a Punker" at 10:00

Personnel
Revive members
Tyler Hall – guitars: acoustic, lead
Dave Hanbury – vocals
Mike TenKate – drums
Rich Thompson – bass guitar

Production details
Producer – Phil Gaudion
Recorded at Rangemaster (David Carr's Studio, Melbourne), overdubs/mixes (Wyong, New South Wales)
Mastering – Crystal Mastering Studios (Melbourne), Sony Music Studios (Sydney)

References

External links
Official website

2004 debut albums
Revive (band) albums